The Chickasawba Mound, designated by the Smithsonian trinomial 3M55, is an archaeological site in Blytheville, Arkansas.  It encompasses the remains of a modest Nodena phase town, with a ceremonial mound and evidence of occupation during the 16th century.  The site is one of the best-preserved Nodena sites in the region.  The site was listed on the National Register of Historic Places in 1984. The site derives its name from Chickasawba, a chief of the Shawnee tribe, said to have been buried at the foot of the mound.

See also
National Register of Historic Places listings in Mississippi County, Arkansas

References

Archaeological sites on the National Register of Historic Places in Arkansas
Blytheville, Arkansas
Nodena Phase
National Register of Historic Places in Mississippi County, Arkansas
Mounds in Arkansas
Native American history of Arkansas